Margrave Charles Magnus of Baden-Durlach (27 March 1621 at Karlsburg Castle in Durlach – 29 November 1658, ibid.) was a titular Margrave of Baden.

Charles Magnus was the son from his first marriage of Margrave Frederick V of Baden and Barbara of Württemberg (4 December 1593 – 8 May 1627), the daughter of the Duke Frederick I of Württemberg.

He married on 23 January 1650 in Schillingsfürst with Countess Marie Juliane of Hohenlohe-Waldenburg (23 March 1622 – 1675), the daughter of Count George Frederick II of Hohenlohe-Waldenburg.  They had the following children:
 Charles Frederick (11 January 1651 – 5 October 1676), a member of the Sovereign Military Order of Malta
 Charlotte Sophie (13 September 1652 – 18 January 1678)
 married on 24 February 1676 Count Emich XIV of Leiningen-Hartenburg (6 February 1649 – 13 December 1684)
 Barbara Eleanor (12 June 1657 – 4 November 1658)
 Friedericke Christine (1658 – March 1659)

1621 births
1658 deaths
17th-century German people
Margraves of Baden-Durlach
Sons of monarchs